Wahono (25 March 1925 – 8 November 2004) was an Indonesian politician who served as Speaker of the People's Consultative Assembly during the New Order regime of president Suharto. Prior to that, he served as the Governor of East Java from 1983 until 1988, and served as a member of the Indonesian National Armed Forces from 1945 until 1977.

References 

1925 births
2004 deaths
Governors of East Java
Indonesian collaborators with Imperial Japan
Members of Pembela Tanah Air
Speakers of the People's Consultative Assembly